Kitchener—Conestoga is a provincial electoral district in Ontario, Canada, that has been represented in the Legislative Assembly of Ontario since the 2007 provincial election. Its population in 2006 was 114,405.

Geography
The district includes the townships of Woolwich, Wellesley and Wilmot, and the southwestern part of the City of Kitchener, i.e., the part of the City of Kitchener lying west of Fischer-Hallman Road.

Members of Provincial Parliament

Election results

	

	

	
		

|align="left" colspan=2|Liberal notional gain from  Progressive Conservative
|align="right"|Swing
|align="right"|  +3.93
|

^ Change based on redistributed results

2007 electoral reform referendum

Sources
Elections Ontario Past Election Results
Map of riding for 2018 election

References

Ontario provincial electoral districts
Politics of Kitchener, Ontario
Woolwich, Ontario